Fernand Leemans (December 13, 1925 – June 3, 2004) was a Belgian figure skater who competed in men's singles.  He won the bronze medal at the European Figure Skating Championships in 1947 and finished 11th at the 1948 Winter Olympics. He was born in Brasschaat and died in Barcelona

Results

References
Fernand Leemans' profile at Sports Reference.com
Fernand Leemans' obituary 

1925 births
2004 deaths
People from Brasschaat
Belgian male single skaters
Olympic figure skaters of Belgium
Sportspeople from Antwerp Province
Figure skaters at the 1948 Winter Olympics
European Figure Skating Championships medalists